Beeron may refer to:
 Beeron, Queensland, a locality in the North Burnett Region, Queensland, Australia
 Beeron National Park, a national park in Beeron